Haloxon is an anthelminthic agent used in veterinary medicine to treat infection in cattle.  It is considered the safest of the organophosphate class of anthelmintics for use in ruminants.

References

Anthelmintics
Organophosphates
Organochlorides
Coumarins